Miodera is a genus of moths of the family Noctuidae.

Species
 Miodera eureka Barnes & Benjamin, 1926
 Miodera stigmata Smith, 1908

References
Natural History Museum Lepidoptera genus database
Miodera at funet

Hadeninae